Samantha "Sam" Gordon (born February 21, 2003) is an American football and soccer player from the Salt Lake City area. After Youtube videos of her skills were uploaded by her father, they went viral and led to her making several media appearances.

Achievements and viral popularity  
In 2012, while regularly playing against all-male teams (competing with some players who were up to twice her weight), Gordon compiled 25 touchdowns and 10 extra point conversions on 232 carries for 1,911 rushing yards in a single season, averaging 8.2 yards per carry. In addition, Gordon recorded 65 tackles for the season while playing defense.  2012 was her first year playing football.

On November 6, 2012, Gordon's father uploaded a highlight video to YouTube that by Thursday of that week had generated nearly 5 million views.  His recording of her football prowess garnered attention from various news outlets, as well as the National Football League.

Media and sporting appearances
Gordon has appeared on Good Morning America, tackled Marshall Faulk on the set of the NFL Network, huddled up with the San Francisco 49ers at practice, and gained the attention and praise of U.S. soccer stars Abby Wambach and Mia Hamm. 49ers running back LaMichael James and former NFL player, Super Bowl MVP, and Heisman Trophy winner Desmond Howard both jokingly stated that she should win the Heisman Trophy. She was featured on a Wheaties cereal box, the company stating that she was chosen because she is an inspiration to young girls. She is the first female football player to appear on a Wheaties box.

Gordon was invited to attend Super Bowl XLVII by the NFL as the guest of NFL Commissioner Roger Goodell. During the Super Bowl weekend, Gordon was a guest blogger for espnW, performed a skit during the NFL Honors award show with Alec Baldwin, attended the Commissioner's press conference and media day, and watched the game in the Commissioner's suite with high ranking political figures and well-known football personalities. Gordon was also featured in an NFL Evolution commercial that aired during the game.

Following the Super Bowl, Gordon attended the Cartoon Network Hall of Game Awards show during which she won a Game trophy for Most Viral Player.

Gordon's football story and the experiences she had following the posting of her YouTube highlight video were the inspiration for the NFL's Together We Make Football contest. Gordon was featured in an NFL commercial that kicked off the contest by asking football fans to share their football stories with the NFL.

Book
With the help of her neighbor, Gordon wrote a book, Sweet Feet: Samantha Gordon's Winning Season, about her football season and the experiences she had following the season, appearing on Conan and Fox and Friends to promote the book.

Utah Girls Football League

In 2015, the first known all-girls tackle football league in America, the Utah Girls Tackle Football League, was formed; Gordon was a founding member. As of 2019, the league has 446 girls, ranging from fourth grade to twelfth grade, on 24 teams; 35% of the girls are minorities.

In June 2017, Gordon and her father joined together with five other Utah Girls Tackle Football League players to sue three different school districts in the Salt Lake City area and force them to offer female American football as a varsity sport. The Title IX-based lawsuit was filed June 23.

Soccer
In 2021, Gordon began playing soccer as a defender for the Lions of Columbia University.

See also
 List of female American football players

References

Players of American football from Salt Lake City
Living people
Female players of American football
2003 births
Soccer players from Salt Lake City
American sportswomen
21st-century American women
American women's soccer players
Women's association football defenders
Columbia Lions women's soccer players